A list of windmills in the Belgian province of Flemish Brabant.

Notes
Bold indicates a mill that is still standing. Italics indicates a mill with some remains surviving.

Buildings and structures in Flemish Brabant
Tourist attractions in Flemish Brabant
Flemish Brabant